This is a list of golfers who have won four or more official money events on the Challenge Tour since it was established in 1986 as published in the tour's media guide. Many of the players on the list have won events on other tours and unofficial events.

This list is up to date through 4 September 2022.

See also
List of golfers to achieve a three-win promotion from the Challenge Tour

References

Challenge Tour
Challenge Tour
 
Challenge Tour